{{Speciesbox
| image = 
| image_caption = 
| taxon = Eulimostraca burragei
| authority = Bartsch, 1917
| synonyms_ref = 
| synonyms = 
 Eulimostraca panamensis  Bartsch, 1917 
 Melanella panamensis  Bartsch, 1917 
 Strombiformis burragei  Bartsch, 1917 
}}Eulimostraca burragei'' is a species of sea snail, a marine gastropod mollusk in the family Eulimidae.

References

External links
 To World Register of Marine Species

Eulimidae
Gastropods described in 1917